Nolana paradoxa, the Chilean bellflower, is a species of flowering plant in the family Solanaceae, native to central and southern Chile. A spreading half-hardy annual reaching  and useful as an edger or ground cover, it requires full sun. There is a cultivar, 'Blue Bird'.

N. paradoxa serves as a model system for scientific studies on flower color.

References

Solanoideae
Garden plants of South America
Endemic flora of Chile
Flora of central Chile
Flora of southern Chile
Plants described in 1825